Johann Kesküll (also Johannes Eduard Kesküll; 24 June 1872  in Tallinn – 3 October 1924 in Tallinn) was an Estonian politician. He was a member of I Riigikogu.

References

1872 births
1924 deaths
Economic Group (Estonia) politicians
Landlords' Party politicians
Farmers' Assemblies politicians
Members of the Riigikogu, 1920–1923
Members of the Riigikogu, 1923–1926
Politicians from Tallinn